Luca Flavio Artaria (born 25 June 1991) is an Italian professional football player currently playing for Seregno. He was born in Milan.

References

1991 births
Living people
Italian footballers
Association football forwards
Footballers from Milan
Aurora Pro Patria 1919 players
S.C. Vallée d'Aoste players